The IBM Personal Computer XT (model 5160, often shortened to PC/XT) is the second computer in the IBM Personal Computer line, released on March 8, 1983. Except for the addition of a built-in hard drive and extra expansion slots, it is very similar to the original IBM PC model 5150 from 1981.

Name 
IBM did not specify an expanded form of "XT" on the machine, press releases, brochures or documentation, but some publications expanded the term as "eXtended Technology" or just "eXTended".

Features 
The XT was regarded as an incremental improvement over the PC and a disappointment compared to the next-generation successor that some had anticipated. Compared to the original IBM PC, the XT has the following major differences:

 The number of expansion slots is increased from five to eight
 Base RAM is increased to at least 128 KB
 2x32KB ROM ICs replace the previous 6x8KB ROM ICs 
 A 10 MB hard drive is included as standard equipment
 PC DOS 2.0 is included
 The 5-pin DIN for the cassette interface is removed

Otherwise the specifications are identical to the original PC.

Expansion slots 
The number of expansion slots in the original IBM PC was a limiting factor for the product, since essential components (such as the video controller, disk controller and printer interface) each came as separate expansion cards and could quickly fill up all five available slots, requiring the user to swap cards in and out as tasks demanded. Some PC clones addressed this problem by integrating components into the motherboard to free up slots, while peripheral manufacturers produced products which integrated multiple functions into one card.

The XT addressed the problem by adding three extra expansion slots for a total of eight. While the slots themselves are identical to those in the original PC, the amount of physical space in the chassis differs, so two of the new slots (located behind the hard drive) cannot accept full-length cards. In addition, the spacing of the slots is narrower than in the original PC, making it impossible to install some multi-board cards.

Expansion unit 
The 5161 is an expansion chassis using an identical case and power supply to the XT, but instead of a system board, provides a backplane with eight card slots. It connects to the main system unit using an Extender Card in the system unit and a Receiver Card in the Expansion Unit, connected by a custom cable. The 5161 shipped with a 10 MB hard drive, and had room for a second one.

The Expansion Unit can also contain extra memory, but the Extender card inserts wait states for memory in the Expansion Unit, so it may be preferable to install memory into the main system unit.

The 5161 can be connected to either an XT or to the earlier 5150 (the original IBM PC).

Other features 
PC DOS 2.0 offers a 9-sector floppy disk format, providing 180K/360K (single- vs. dual-sided) capacity per disk, compared to the 160K/320K provided by the 8-sector format of previous releases.

The XT was not offered in a floppy-only model for its first two years on the market, although the standard ribbon cable with two floppy connectors was still included. At that time, in order to get a second floppy drive, the user had to purchase the 5161 expansion chassis.

Like the original PC, the XT comes with IBM BASIC in ROM. The XT BIOS also displays a memory count during the POST, unlike the original PC.

The XT has a desktop case similar to that of the IBM PC.

The power supply is 130 watts, an upgrade from the original PC. Those sold in the US are configured for 120 V AC only and could not be used with 240 V mains supplies. XTs with 240 V-compatible power supplies were later sold in international markets. Both were rated at 130 watts.

Revisions and variants

IBM made several submodels of the XT.

The 3270 PC, a variant of the XT featuring 3270 terminal emulation, was released in October 1983.

Submodel 068 and 078, released in 1985, offered dual-floppy configurations without a hard drive as well, and the new Enhanced Graphics Adapter and Professional Graphics Adapter became available as video card options.

In 1986, the 256–640 KB motherboard models were launched, which switched to half-height drives.

Submodels 268, 278 and 089 came with 101-key keyboards (essentially the IBM Model M, but in a modified variant that used the XT's keyboard protocol and lacked LEDs).

Submodels 267, 277 and 088 had the original keyboard, but 3.5" floppy drives became available and 20MB Seagate ST-225 hard disks in 5.25" half-height size replaced the full-height 10 MB drives.

Submodel 788 was the only XT sold with the Color Graphics Adapter as a standard feature.

Submodels 568, 588, and 589 were used as basis for the XT/370; they had an additional (co-)processor board that could execute System/370 instructions. An XT-based machine with a Series/1 co-processor board existed as well, but it had its own System Unit number, the IBM 4950.

IBM XT 286 

In 1986 the XT 286 (model 5162) was released with a 6 MHz Intel 80286 processor. Despite being marketed as a lower-tier model than the IBM AT, this system runs many applications faster than the ATs of the time with 6 MHz 286 processors, since it has zero-wait state RAM.

It shipped with 640 KB RAM standard, an AT-style 1.2 MB high-density diskette drive and a 20 MB hard disk. Despite these features, reviews rated it as a poor market value.

The XT 286 uses a 157-watt power supply, which can internally switch between 115 or 230 V AC operation.

Reception
The XT was well received, although PC DOS 2.0 was regarded as a greater improvement than any of the hardware changes, and by the end of 1983 IBM was selling every unit they made.

Clones and competition
The Compaq Portable also came out in March 1983, and would prove a popular competitor. Sometimes called the "first PC clone" and first "legal clone", that distinction may go to another offering: Columbia Data Products' MPC 1600 "Multi Personal Computer", in June 1982.
 Other "clones" included the Seequa Chameleon, the Hyperion, Eagle Computer's Eagle 1600 that September and the Corona PC. The latter two companies were sued by IBM and settled out of court, agreeing to re-implement their BIOS in a way that did not violate IBM's copyrights. AT&T, who owned a 25% share of Olivetti, released the AT&T PC 6300 in June 1984, which was a re-branded version of the Olivetti M24. The PC 6300 offered the 16-bit 8086 clocked at a faster 8 MHz speed that was technically superior to IBM's PC XT.

End of life
The XT was discontinued in the spring of 1987.

See also
Amiga Sidecar
PC-based IBM-compatible mainframes#Personal Computer XT/370

References

Notes

IBM (1983). Personal Computer Hardware Reference Library: Guide to Operations, Personal Computer XT. IBM Part Number 6936831.

External links

 IBM 5160 information at www.minuszerodegrees.net
Photo galleries:
 XT with 256 KB on system board
 XT 286

Personal Computer XT
Computer-related introductions in 1983
16-bit computers